Midway is a 2019 war film about the Battle of Midway, a turning point in the Pacific Theater of World War II. The film was directed by Roland Emmerich, who also produced the film with Harald Kloser, and was written by Wes Tooke. The film stars Ed Skrein, Patrick Wilson, Luke Evans, Aaron Eckhart, Nick Jonas, Mandy Moore, Dennis Quaid, Tadanobu Asano, Darren Criss, and Woody Harrelson.

The film was a passion project of Emmerich's, and he had trouble getting financial support for the film before finally raising sufficient funds and officially announcing the project in 2017. Much of the cast joined in summer 2018, and filming began in Hawaii that September. Some filming also took place in Montreal. With a production budget of $100million, it is to date one of the most expensive independent films of all time.

Midway was theatrically released by Lionsgate and Summit Entertainment in the United States on November8, 2019 and received mixed reviews from critics, who praised the visuals but criticized the screenplay. The film was a box office bomb, grossing only $126 million worldwide against a $100 million budget.

Plot

In December 1937 in Tokyo, American naval attaché intelligence officer Lieutenant Commander Edwin T. Layton and his counterpart are discussing the US and Japanese positions in the Pacific Ocean during a state function. Layton is warned by Admiral Isoroku Yamamoto that if the US threatens the Japanese oil supply, then the Japanese will take immediate action.

After the US cuts off Japan's oil supply, the Japanese use their carrier fleet to strike at Pearl Harbor on December 7, 1941. The attack leads the US to enter World War II. Naval aviator Lieutenant Dick Best and the Air Group (CAG) of the carrier  fail to find the Japanese carrier fleet, exacerbating his rivalry with his commanding officer Lieutenant Commander Eugene E. Lindsey. Admiral Yamamoto, with the support of Rear Admiral Tamon Yamaguchi, proposes his most audacious plan yet—the invasion of Midway Island using the four available carriers of the "Kido Butai", but are overruled by the Army. Enterprise launches raids against the Marshall Islands in February 1942. During an attack by Mitsubishi G3M Nell bombers, one crippled Nell turns back towards the ship in a suicide ramming attempt, but Aviation  Machinist's Mate Third Class Bruno Gaido shoots the aircraft down from a parked Dauntless. The crashing bomber slices Gaido's Dauntless in half, but he survives. Vice Admiral William "Bull" Halsey, impressed by Gaido's courage, promotes him to Aviation Machinist's Mate First Class. In April 1942, following Lieutenant Colonel Jimmy Doolittle's raid on the Japanese mainland, Yamamoto, Yamaguchi and Vice Admiral Chuichi Nagumo are finally allowed to begin their plan to attack Midway.

In May 1942, following the Battle of the Coral Sea, Layton, along with Joseph Rochefort and his cryptology team, begin intercepting messages concerning a location the Japanese identify as "AF." Layton speaks with Admiral Chester Nimitz, who informs him that Washington believes "AF" to be a target in the South Pacific. Layton disagrees, believing the intended target to be Midway Atoll. After meeting with Rochefort, Nimitz instructs the team to find a way to prove that "AF" is Midway definitively. After Layton instructs Midway to telegraph in the clear (unencrypted) that they are suffering a water shortage, cryptologists working for Rochefort intercept Japanese communications concerning water shortages on "AF," confirming that "AF" is indeed Midway.

In preparation for an ambush of the Japanese fleet, Nimitz orders carriers  and Enterprise recalled from the Coral Sea and demands that the damaged  be made ready for combat operations. During the preparations, Best is briefly demoralized after one of his proteges crashes during a takeoff. Still, he receives encouragement from the Commander of the Air Group (CAG) of the Enterprise, Wade McCluskey. Best and Lindsey set aside their differences and work together to prepare for the attack. Halsey is put on shore leave by Nimitz after receiving a bad case of the shingles and is temporarily replaced by Raymond A. Spruance.

On June 4, the Japanese launch an air attack against Midway. Initial attempts by US land-based aircraft to strike at the Japanese fleet carriers fail. The Japanese fleet learns of the presence of the American carriers. American submarine  unsuccessfully attacks a Japanese carrier and is chased off by Japanese destroyer . Lindsey and other American torpedo squadrons attack the Japanese fleet but are shot down. Realizing that the Americans' attacks are preventing the fleet from launching their counterstrike, Yamaguchi orders Nagumo to launch his strike as soon as possible. Despite suffering from respiratory issues from breathing a bad mix of oxygen, Best refuses to leave his men behind and leads his and McCluskey's squadrons into battle. Upon spotting the Arashi, McClusky correctly infers the Japanese destroyer is rushing back to the main Japanese fleet and leads his planes to follow its course. Nagumo, demoralized and in a state of shock, is persuaded by Genda to transfer his flag to a cruiser. Frank Woodrow O'Flaherty and Gaido are shot down, picked up by the Japanese, and executed when they refuse to talk. Yamaguchi, aboard , is more willing to fight and launches a strike wave that succeeds in crippling Yorktown, prompting Enterprise and Hornet to launch their remaining aircraft. Best leads the squadron, which successfully inflicts severe damage to the Hiryu. Admiral Yamaguchi and Captain Tomeo Kaku go down with their command as Hiryu is scuttled.

Yamamoto receives news that his carrier force has been destroyed. After learning that the American fleet has withdrawn, thus depriving him of the chance to use his main force of battleships to win a night battle against the American fleet, he orders a general withdrawal. At Pearl Harbor, Rochefort intercepts the Japanese order to withdraw and passes it to Layton, who then informs Nimitz. Meanwhile, Best is discharged from the Navy for his lung problems and decides to return home to his wife and daughter, who are both overjoyed to see that he survived.

Cast

Allies

Japanese

Civilians

Production
On May 23, 2017, it was reported that Roland Emmerich would be directing the World WarII film Midway. Due to its potential lofty budget (with estimates putting its needed cost at $125million), Emmerich had trouble getting the film greenlit. When no major studio would bankroll the project, he cut down on potential battle sequences and turned to individuals for the funds, resulting in $76million; he then got an additional $24million in equity, mostly from Chinese investors, resulting in the film's $100million budget. It is one of the most costly independent films ever made. Emmerich had previously attempted to mount the film at Sony Pictures in the 1990s, with William Goldman becoming interested in the project. However, as with the final rendition, executives balked at the proposed $100million budget ($152million by 2019 inflation), and Emmerich moved on to direct The Patriot.

Harald Kloser also produced the film.

In April 2018, Woody Harrelson and Mandy Moore joined the ensemble cast for the film. In July 2018, Luke Evans was cast in the film to play Lieutenant Commander Wade McClusky, who was awarded the Navy Cross for his role in the Battle of Midway. Robby Baumgartner was hired as cinematographer. August saw the additions of Patrick Wilson, Ed Skrein, Aaron Eckhart, Nick Jonas, Tadanobu Asano, Dennis Quaid, and others to the cast. Darren Criss, Alexander Ludwig, and Brandon Sklenar were cast in September. Filming began on September5, 2018, in Honolulu, Hawaii. It was also shot in Montreal, Quebec.

In November 2018, it was announced that VFX company Scanline VFX will be the main VFX vendor, and that Pixomondo had signed on to provide additional visual effects.

Release

The film was released on November 8, 2019, Veterans Day weekend.

Marketing
A teaser poster for the film was released on June4, 2019, which was also the 77th anniversary of the Battle of Midway. A set of 13 still photographs depicting scenes from the film was released on June26, 2019, and the first trailer for the film was released the following day (June27). The second and final trailer of the film was released on September12, 2019, with the film's theatrical poster on September25. All-in-all, Lionsgate spent around $40million promoting the film.

Home media
Midway was released on Digital HD on February4, 2020, and on DVD and Blu-ray and Ultra HD Blu-ray on February18, 2020.

Reception

Box office
Midway grossed $56.8million in the United States and Canada, and $68.5million in other countries, for a worldwide total of $125.4million, against a production budget of $100million.

In the United States and Canada, Midway was released alongside Doctor Sleep, Playing with Fire, and Last Christmas, and was projected to gross around $15million from 3,242 theaters in its opening weekend. The film made $6.3million on its first day (including $925,000 from Thursday night previews). It went on to debut to $17.5million, beating box office expectations and upsetting projected winner Doctor Sleep by finishing first at the box office. In its second weekend the film made $8.8million, finishing second behind newcomer Ford v Ferrari, before making $4.7million and finishing in fifth in its third weekend.

Critical response
The site's critics consensus reads: "Midway revisits a well-known story with modern special effects and a more balanced point of view, but its screenplay isn't quite ready for battle." On Metacritic, the film has a weighted average score of 47 out of 100 based on 28 critics, indicating "mixed or average reviews". Audiences polled by CinemaScore gave the film an average grade of "A" on an A+ to F scale, while those at PostTrak gave it an average 4 out of 5 stars, with 58% saying they would definitely recommend it.

Barry Hertz of The Globe and Mail gave the film a score of 2/4 stars, describing it as "a Second World War epic that runs a comparatively paltry 138 minutes yet feels about five times as long", concluding that the film was "a choppy bore, its main source of intrigue centred around whatever New Jersey-ese accent British actor Ed Skrein is attempting as dive bomber Richard Best." Michael O'Sullivan of The Washington Post gave the film a score of 2.5/4 stars, saying that it "tells a story that’s vividly and viscerally rendered, with all the entertainment value of a big, old-fashioned war movie", but added: "the kiss-kiss never really registers with quite the same impact as the bang-bang." Wendy Ide of The Observer gave the film a score of 2/5 stars, writing: "Every tired war movie cliche is unearthed in a film that brings nothing new but will no doubt please fans of men in uniform yelling at explosions."

Paul Byrnes of The Sydney Morning Herald gave the film a score of 3/5 stars, describing it as "one of [Roland Emmerich's] better films", but added: "There are a number of earlier versions to pick from, including John Ford's original 18-minute Oscar-winning documentary. We didn't need a new one, unless he had something new to say or a new way to say it. To both questions, the answer is no." Owen Gleiberman of Variety wrote: "The film's drama is B-movie basic. But the destructive colliding metal-on-metal inferno of what war is what makes Midway a picture worth seeing." Kenneth Turan of the Los Angeles Times described the film as being "so square, so old-school and old-fashioned, it almost feels avant-garde", adding: "It aims to celebrate heroism, sacrifice, determination and grit, and if you don’t like that it really does not care."

Historical accuracy
While the film takes some artistic license, Emmerich and Tooke were both adamant about being historically accurate, and Midway received praise from some combat veterans and historians for being more accurate of events than Midway (1976) and Pearl Harbor (2001). Naval History and Heritage Command director and retired Navy Rear Admiral Sam Cox said: "Despite some of the 'Hollywood' aspects, this is still the most realistic movie about naval combat ever made."

Several seemingly "Hollywood-ized" events depicted in the film, such as Bruno Gaido sprinting into a parked plane in an effort to shoot down a crippled plane attempting to crash into the Enterprise, then getting on-spot promoted, occurred as shown, though according to USA Today, "Gaido hid after shooting the plane down, afraid he was going to get in trouble for leaving his battle station.  'They had to hunt him down and bring him to Halsey', says [Retired U.S. Navy Rear Adm. Samuel J. Cox, director of the Naval History and Heritage Command]."

The film depicts the naval attack on the Marshall Islands (February 1, 1942) correctly.

See also
 Midway (1976 film)
 Pearl Harbor (film)
 Tora! Tora! Tora! (1970 film)

References

External links
 
 
 

2010s English-language films
2010s war films
2010s historical films
2019 films
2019 independent films
Action films based on actual events
American World War II films
American epic films
American historical films
American independent films
Canadian World War II films
Canadian epic films
Canadian historical films
Canadian independent films
Centropolis Entertainment films
Cultural depictions of Isoroku Yamamoto
Entertainment One films
Films about the Battle of Midway
Films about the Doolittle Raid
Films about naval aviation
Films about submarine warfare
Films about the United States Army Air Forces
Films about the United States Navy in World War II
Films directed by Roland Emmerich
Films scored by Harald Kloser
Films set in 1937
Films set in 1941
Films set in 1942
Films set in China
Films set in Hawaii
Films set in Honolulu
Films set in the Marshall Islands
Films set in the Pacific Ocean
Films set in Tokyo
Films set on aircraft
Films set on aircraft carriers
Films set in the United States Minor Outlying Islands
Films shot in Honolulu
Films shot in Montreal
Japan in non-Japanese culture
2010s Japanese-language films
Lionsgate films
Pacific War films
Pearl Harbor films
Summit Entertainment films
War epic films
World War II aviation films
World War II films based on actual events
World War II naval films
2010s American films
2010s Canadian films
English-language Canadian films